Ivan Minčič (born 14 March 1989) is a Slovak football defender who currently plays for Fortuna Liga club ŽP Šport Podbrezová.

Club career

FO ŽP Šport Podbrezová
He made his professional debut for ŽP Šport Podbrezová against ŠK Slovan Bratislava on 11 July 2014.

References

External links
 
 ŽP Šport Podbrezová profile
 Eurofotbal profile

1989 births
Living people
Slovak footballers
Association football defenders
MFK Snina players
FK Železiarne Podbrezová players
FK Dukla Banská Bystrica players
Slovak Super Liga players
People from Snina
Sportspeople from the Prešov Region